Megan Sikora (born April 11, 1979) is an American actress who has appeared on Broadway in several musicals. She originated the role of Bambi Bernet in Curtains in 2007.

Early life
Sikora grew up in Pittsburgh, Pennsylvania. She began dancing at age three, and she attended Point Park University, where she earned a B.A. in dance. At age 19, she joined the cast of the German version of Beauty and the Beast and toured Germany and Austria. She was selected as one of the American women to dance ballet at the 1998 Winter Olympics in Nagano.

Career
Sikora debuted on Broadway in 42nd Street in 2001 as Lorraine/Ensemble.

She appeared in other shows such as Thoroughly Modern Millie in 2002 as Ruth/Ensemble, Wonderful Town, Dracula, and Wicked, where she understudied Glinda and Nessarose. In 2007, she reached her breakthrough when cast as the determined dancing fanatic Bambi Bernet in the Broadway musical Curtains. She appeared on Broadway and the Los Angeles out of town tryout as well.

She appeared in the Broadway revival of Promises, Promises opposite Kristin Chenoweth in 2010. In March 2011, she played the role of Miss Krumholtz in the Broadway revival of How to Succeed in Business Without Really Trying. She was nominated for the 2011 Astaire Award, Female Dancer, Broadway for this role. She played the role of Joan and others and was the dance captain in the Broadway production of The Nance in 2013. 

Sikora played Lila Dixon in the musical Holiday Inn, which opened on Broadway in October 2016. For her performance, she won the 2017 Chita Rivera Award for Outstanding Female Dancer in a Broadway Show.

Personal life
Sikora is married to actor Barrett Martin, whom she met while performing in Wicked. They have a son, named Elliot.

Theatre credits

References

1979 births
Living people
Actresses from Pittsburgh
American musical theatre actresses
21st-century American actresses
Point Park University alumni
American people of Polish descent